Michael Spice (20 May 1931 – 2 November 1983) was a British character actor who appeared in television roles.

He portrayed two Doctor Who villains, the voice of Morbius in The Brain of Morbius, and Magnus Greel in The Talons of Weng-Chiang.

Spice played the character of Peter Tyson in the BBC Radio play The Ropewalk in January 1969. The play evolved into the long-running BBC Radio 2 serial Waggoners' Walk, in which Basil Moss took over the role of Peter Tyson, with Spice taking the role of Matt Prior, a role he played until the serial's end in May 1980.

Spice other screen roles included minor characters in A Countess from Hong Kong, The Brothers,, Public Eye and Blake's 7.

References

External links

1931 births
1983 deaths
English male television actors
20th-century English male actors